Great Horton is a ward in the metropolitan borough of the City of Bradford, West Yorkshire, England. It contains 74 listed buildings that are recorded in the National Heritage List for England.  Of these, one is listed at Grade II*, the middle of the three grades, and the others are at Grade II, the lowest grade.  The ward is to the southeast of the centre of the city of Bradford and is mainly residential.  Most of the listed buildings are houses and cottages and associated structures, farmhouses and farm buildings.  The other listed buildings include public houses, churches and chapels, former mills, a former school, a library, and a pair of telephone kiosks.


Key

Buildings

References

Citations

Sources

 

Lists of listed buildings in West Yorkshire
Listed